Nitwit, a colloquial noun for a stupid person, may refer to:

an idiot
Nittany Nation, formerly known "Nittwits", a student organization
Dr. Nitwhite, a scientist in Between the Lions
Sid Millward and His Nitwits, a British parody band between the 1930s and 1970s

See also
Baggy Pants and the Nitwits